Off Their Rockers is a British hidden camera sketch series on ITV. The programme is based on the American series Betty White's Off Their Rockers. The UK series sees senior citizens turn the tables on unsuspecting members of the public in a series of funny and unexpected pranks. The format originates from Belgium ("Benidorm Bastards").

Two special episodes known as the Blue Badge specials aired in June 2015, starring a new cast.

Cast
Current

Rosemary Macvie (2013–)
Rosie Bannister (2013–)
Royston Mayoh (2013–)
Seb Craig (2013–)
Sonia Elliman (2013–)
Keith Bayross (2013–)
Morrison Thomas (2013–)
Chris Lewis (2014–; Uncredited)
Velma Davies (2013–)
Nick Hobbs (2014–)
Tony Lo (2014–)
Ken Moxley (2014–)
Dave Norman (2014–)
Marry Hyam (2014–)
Denise Ryan (2014–; Stunts)
Ray Casey (2014–; Uncredited)
Joan Hooley (2015–)
Pamela Lyne (2015–)
Andrew Haynes (2015–)

Former

Iris Sharples (2013–2014) – Died during filming for the second series
Hugo Gunning (2013–2014)
Barry Newton (2013–2015)
Paul Weston (2014–2015)

Blue Badge specials cast

Jack Binstead
Stephen Bunce
Ollie Hancock
Paul Henshall
Tommy Jessop
Karina Jones
Francesca Mills
Liam O'Carroll
Reece Pantry
Jacqui Press
Daniel Wilkes

Transmissions

Episodes

Series 1
The first series of Off Their Rockers aired for six episodes from 7 April until 12 May 2013.

Series 2
The second series was commissioned in July 2013. It began airing on 6 April 2014 and ran for seven episodes. The final episode of this series was dedicated to Iris Sharples, a former participant, who died on 22 November 2013, during filming for the second series.

Series 3
A third series was commissioned in August 2014 and began airing on 1 March 2015 for six episodes.

Blue Badge Specials
The two Blue Badge special episodes were announced on 12 April 2015, during the concluding episode of series 3. These were aired in June 2015 on Mondays at 9:30pm.

Series 4
A fourth series was commissioned and began airing on 6 November 2016 for six episodes. The show moved to an earlier timeslot of 18:30 on Sunday evenings. This series saw celebrities taking part in the pranks for the first time.

References

External links
 
 Off Their Rockers on Twitter
 

2013 British television series debuts
2016 British television series endings
2010s British comedy television series
British comedy television shows
Hidden camera television series
ITV comedy
Television series by Sony Pictures Television
English-language television shows
British television series based on American television series